Carolina Coliseum is a 12,401-seat multi-purpose arena in Columbia, South Carolina, built in 1968 by the University of South Carolina. The Coliseum was the largest arena in South Carolina at the time of its completion. It was the home of the USC men's and women's basketball teams for many years as well as Columbia's main events venue until 2002, when the Colonial Life Arena (originally named Carolina Center), opened a block away on Greene Street. The Coliseum was once home to the Columbia Inferno hockey team, a franchisee of the East Coast Hockey League (ECHL), until poor ticket sales caused the Inferno to leave. The team planned to  move to another venue, but it did not materialize.

The facility is also home to university classrooms with classes held in the lower levels. The high school commencement ceremonies of many high schools in the South Carolina Midlands are held annually in the arena as many school venues are too small for such ceremonies.

Prior to the building of the Coliseum, the Gamecocks had played in Carolina Fieldhouse from 1927 until it burned in 1968, and the Carolina Gymnasium (now the Longstreet Theater) prior to that.

The Coliseum was the host of the NCAA Basketball Tournament East Regional in 1970. Until 2002, when Greenville's Bon Secours Wellness Arena served as host, it was the only time the tournament was played in South Carolina. The Metro Conference men's basketball tournament was held here in 1989.

In 1977, the playing surface was renamed "Frank McGuire Arena" after then head basketball coach Frank McGuire.  McGuire had been inducted into the Basketball Hall of Fame a few weeks earlier.

The Coliseum is university owned but it is managed by Comcast Spectacor subsidiary Spectra. A conflict with a Miranda Lambert concert at Colonial Life Arena resulted in the USC Athletics Department moving the January 17, 2013 women's basketball game against Louisiana State University to the Coliseum. This was the first use of the facility as the official backup venue for the USC teams since play began in Colonial Life Center.

Officials subsequently announced that no more games will be played in the Coliseum. In the fall of 2014, 3000 seats were removed and the arena floor was converted into two practice courts for the Gamecock men's and women's teams. The old Coliseum playing surface was auctioned in January for $23,215.

References

Defunct indoor ice hockey venues in the United States
Basketball venues in South Carolina
Indoor arenas in South Carolina
South Carolina Gamecocks basketball venues
Defunct college basketball venues in the United States
1968 establishments in South Carolina
Sports venues completed in 1968